

333001–333100 

|-bgcolor=#f2f2f2
| colspan=4 align=center | 
|}

333101–333200 

|-bgcolor=#f2f2f2
| colspan=4 align=center | 
|}

333201–333300 

|-bgcolor=#f2f2f2
| colspan=4 align=center | 
|}

333301–333400 

|-bgcolor=#f2f2f2
| colspan=4 align=center | 
|}

333401–333500 

|-bgcolor=#f2f2f2
| colspan=4 align=center | 
|}

333501–333600 

|-id=508
| 333508 Voiture ||  || Vincent Voiture (1597–1648), a French poet and prosateur. || 
|}

333601–333700 

|-id=636
| 333636 Reboul ||  || Henri Reboul (born 1946), a French cosmologist. || 
|-id=639
| 333639 Yaima ||  || The Yaeyama Islands (local name "Yaima"), located at the southernmost end of Japan || 
|}

333701–333800 

|-id=717
| 333717 Alexgreaves ||  || Alexander Richard Brian Greaves (born 2000), grandson of British discoverer Norman Falla || 
|-id=744
| 333744 Pau ||  || Pau Bosch-Pellicer (born 2007) is the first grandson of the discoverer. || 
|}

333801–333900 

|-bgcolor=#f2f2f2
| colspan=4 align=center | 
|}

333901–334000 

|-bgcolor=#f2f2f2
| colspan=4 align=center | 
|}

References 

333001-334000